Sulaibiya is a small town in Al Jahra Governorate, Kuwait.

Sulaibiya has two Industrial Areas containing several construction materials industries and a Residential Area consisting of 10 blocks.

Towards the end of Sulaibiya, you approach Sulabikat which is closer to the Kuwaiti grand cemetery.

Industrial area

Wastewater treatment plant 
As of 2015, the General Electric-built Wasterwater treatment plant in the district waste the world's largest membrane-based water treatment facility handling 600,000 cubic meters of water a day.

Tire graveyard 

The industrial area contains a waste disposal area that includes the world's largest tire dump. It has been under development since at least 2010. In April 2021, a fire was reported at the site. In October 2020 a major tire fire in the graveyard was visible from space, burning 25,000 square meters of the deposit or about 1 million tires. A previous fire happened in the site during 2012. Both fires caused severe air pollution, and tire fires release large amount of heavy metals and oils that can contaminate the surrounding environment. Following the fire, the Kuwait Environment Public Authority said it would dispose of the tires.

References

See also 
 List of weather records
 Kuwait (Climate)

Districts of Al Jahra Governorate
Temperature